The South-Tambeyskoye gas field is a natural gas field located in the Yamalo-Nenets Autonomous Okrug. It was discovered in 1974. The field is operated by Yamal LNG, controlled by Novatek. It produces natural gas and condensates.

The field was discovered in 1974 and it began production in 1976. In 1990s–2000s, until 2005, the license belonged to Tambeyneftegaz, controlled by Nikolay Bogachyov. In 2005, the license was reassigned to Yamal LNG. Novatek took control of Yamal LNG in 2009.

It supplies the Yamal LNG plant.

High-ethane gas will supply the ethane separation and Baltic LNG plant at Ust-Luga, with a planned start in 2026.

References

Natural gas fields in Russia
Natural gas fields in the Soviet Union